In computer science and mathematics, more precisely in automata theory, model theory and formal language, a regular numerical predicate is a kind of relation over integers. One of the main interests of this class of predicates is that it can be defined in plenty of different ways, using different logical formalisms. Furthermore, most of the definitions use only basic notions, and thus allows to relate foundations of various fields of fundamental computer science such as automata theory, syntactic semigroup, model theory and semigroup theory.

The class of regular numerical predicate is denoted ,  and REG.

Definitions 
The class of regular numerical predicate admits a lot of equivalent definitions. They are now given. In all of those definitions, we fix  and  a (numerical) predicate of arity .

Automata with variables 
The first definition encodes predicate as a formal language. A predicate is said to be regular if the formal language is regular.

For example, the vector  is represented by the word .

The numerical predicate  is said to be regular if  is a regular language over the alphabet . This is the reason for the use of the word "regular" to describe this kind of numerical predicate.

Automata reading unary numbers 
This second definition is similar to the previous one. Predicates are encoded into languages in a different way, and the predicate is said to be regular if and only if the language is regular.

Our alphabet  is the set of vectors of  binary digits. That is: . Before explaining how to encode a vector of numbers, we explain how to encode a single number.

Given a vector of  integers , let .

As in the previous definition, the numerical predicate  is said to be regular if  is a regular language over the alphabet .

A predicate is regular if and only if it can be defined by a monadic second order formula , or equivalently by an existential monadic second order formula, where the only atomic predicate is the successor function .

A predicate is regular if and only if it can be defined by a first order logic formula , where the atomic predicates are:
 the order relation ,

Congruence arithmetic 
The language of congruence arithmetic is defined as the est of Boolean combinations, where  the atomic predicates are:
 the addition of a constant , with  an integral constant,
 the order relation ,
 the modular relations, with a fixed modular value.

A predicate is regular if and only if it can be defined in the language of congruence arithmetic. The equivalence with previous definition is due to quantifier elimination.

Using recursion and patterns 
This definition requires a fixed parameter .
In order to introduce the definition of -regular, the trivial case where  should be considered separately. When , then the predicate  is either the constant true or the constant false. Those two predicates are said to be -regular (for every ). Let us now assume that . In order to introduce the definition of regular predicate in this case, we need to introduce the notion of section of a predicate.

For example, let us consider  the sum predicate .

The last equivalent definition of regular predicate can now be given. A predicate  of arity  is -regular if it satisfies the two following conditions:
 all of its sections are -regular,
 there exists a threshold  such that, for each vectors  with each , .

The second property intuitively means that, when number are big enough, then their exact value does not matter. The properties which matters are the order relation between the numbers and their value modulo the period .

Using recognizable semigroups 
That is, the vector in  whose -th component is 1 if , and 0 otherwise. Given a sequence  of sets, let .

Definition of non regular language 
The predicate  is regular if and only if all languages which can be defined in first order logic with atomic predicates for letters and the atomic predicate  are regular. The same property would hold for the monadic second order logic, and with modular quantifiers.

Reducing arity 
The following property allows to reduce an arbitrarily complex non-regular predicate to a simpler binary predicate which is also non-regular.

Let us assume that  is definable in Presburger Arithmetic.

Properties 
The class of regular numerical predicate satisfies many properties.

Satisfiability 
As in previous case, let us assume that  is definable in Presburger Arithmetic.

Closure property 
The class of regular predicates is closed under union, intersection, complement, taking a section, projection and Cartesian product.

Decidability 
It is decidable whether a predicate defined in Presburger arithmetic is regular.

Elimination of quantifier 
The logic  considered above admit the elimination of quantifier. More precisely, the algorithm for elimination of quantifier by Cooper does not introduce multiplication by constants nor sums of variable. Therefore, when applied to a  it returns a quantifier-free formula in.

References

Automata (computation)
 
Theoretical computer science